

Events

Pre-1600
1236 – King Henry III of England marries Eleanor of Provence.
1301 – Andrew III of Hungary dies, ending the Árpád dynasty in Hungary.

1601–1900
1639 – The "Fundamental Orders", the first written constitution that created a government, is adopted in Connecticut.
1761 – The Third Battle of Panipat is fought in India between the Afghans under Ahmad Shah Durrani and the Marathas.
1784 – American Revolutionary War: Ratification Day, United States - Congress ratifies the Treaty of Paris with Great Britain.
1814 – Treaty of Kiel: Frederick VI of Denmark cedes the Kingdom of Norway to Charles XIII of Sweden in return for Pomerania.
1858 – Napoleon III of France escapes an assassination attempt made by Felice Orsini and his accomplices in Paris.
1899 – RMS Oceanic (1899) is launched. She is the largest ship afloat since Brunel's SS Great Eastern.
1900 – Giacomo Puccini's Tosca opens in Rome.

1901–present
1907 – An earthquake in Kingston, Jamaica kills more than 1,000 people.
1911 – Roald Amundsen's South Pole expedition makes landfall on the eastern edge of the Ross Ice Shelf.
1939 – Norway claims Queen Maud Land in Antarctica.
1943 – World War II: Japan begins Operation Ke, the successful operation to evacuate its forces from Guadalcanal during the Guadalcanal Campaign.
  1943   – World War II: Franklin D. Roosevelt and Winston Churchill begin the Casablanca Conference to discuss strategy and study the next phase of the war.
  1951 – National Airlines Flight 83 crashes during landing at Philadelphia International Airport, killing seven passengers and crew.
1952 – NBC's long-running morning news program Today debuts, with host Dave Garroway.
1953 – Josip Broz Tito is elected the first President of Yugoslavia.
1954 – The Hudson Motor Car Company merges with Nash-Kelvinator Corporation forming the American Motors Corporation.
1957 – Kripalu Maharaj is named fifth Jagadguru (world teacher) after giving seven days of speeches before 500 Hindu scholars.
1960 – The Reserve Bank of Australia, the country's central bank and banknote issuing authority authorized by the 1959 Reserve Bank Act, is established.
1967 – Counterculture of the 1960s: The Human Be-In takes place in San Francisco, California's Golden Gate Park, launching the Summer of Love.
1969 – USS Enterprise fire: An accidental explosion aboard the  near Hawaii kills 28 people.
1972 – Queen Margrethe II of Denmark ascends the throne, the first Queen of Denmark since 1412 and the first Danish monarch not named Frederick or Christian since 1513.
1973 – Elvis Presley's concert Aloha from Hawaii is broadcast live via satellite, and sets the record as the most watched broadcast by an individual entertainer in television history.
1993 – In Poland's worst peacetime maritime disaster, ferry MS Jan Heweliusz sinks off the coast of Rügen, drowning 55 passengers and crew; nine crew-members are saved.
2004 – The national flag of the Republic of Georgia, the so-called "five cross flag", is restored to official use after a hiatus of some 500 years.
2010 – Yemen declares an open war against the terrorist group al-Qaeda.
2011 – President Zine El Abidine Ben Ali of Tunisia seeks refuge in Saudi Arabia after a series of demonstrations against his regime, considered to be the birth of the Arab Spring.
2019 – A Saha Airlines Boeing 707 crashes at Fath Air Base near Karaj in Alborz Province, Iran, killing 15 people.

Births

Pre-1600
83 BC – Mark Antony, Roman general and politician (d. 30 BCE)
1131 – Valdemar I of Denmark (d. 1182)
1273 – Joan I of Navarre, queen regnant of Navarre, queen consort of France (d. 1305)
1451 – Franchinus Gaffurius, Italian composer and theorist (d. 1522)
1477 – Hermann of Wied, German archbishop (d. 1552)
1476 – Anne St Leger, Baroness de Ros, English baroness (d. 1526)
1507 – Catherine of Austria, Queen of Portugal (d. 1578)
  1507   – Luca Longhi, Italian painter (d. 1580)
1551 – Abu'l-Fazl ibn Mubarak, Grand vizier of emperor Akbar (d. 1602)
1552 – Alberico Gentili, Italian-English academic and jurist (d. 1608)

1601–1900
1683 – Gottfried Silbermann, German instrument maker (d. 1753)
1684 – Johann Matthias Hase, German mathematician, astronomer, and cartographer (d. 1742)
  1684   – Jean-Baptiste van Loo, French painter (d. 1745)
1699 – Jakob Adlung, German organist, historian, and theorist (d. 1762)
1700 – Picander, German poet and playwright (d. 1764)
1702 – Emperor Nakamikado of Japan (d. 1737)
1705 – Jean-Baptiste Charles Bouvet de Lozier, French sailor, explorer, and politician (d. 1786)
1741 – Benedict Arnold, American-British general (d. 1801)
1767 – Maria Theresa of Austria (d. 1827)
1780 – Henry Baldwin, American judge and politician (d. 1844)
1792 – Christian de Meza, Danish general (d. 1865)
1793 – John C. Clark, American lawyer and politician (d. 1852)
1798 – Johan Rudolph Thorbecke, Dutch historian, jurist, and politician, 3rd Prime Minister of the Netherlands (d. 1872)
1800 – Ludwig Ritter von Köchel, Austrian composer, botanist, and publisher (d. 1877)
1806 – Charles Hotham, English-Australian soldier and politician, 1st Governor of Victoria (d. 1855)
  1806   – Matthew Fontaine Maury, American astronomer, oceanographer, and historian (d. 1873)
1818 – Zachris Topelius, Finnish author and journalist (d. 1898)
1819 – Dimitrie Bolintineanu, Romanian poet and politician (d. 1872)
1824 – Vladimir Stasov, Russian critic (d. 1906)
1834 – Duncan Gillies, Scottish-Australian politician, 14th Premier of Victoria (d. 1903)
1836 – Henri Fantin-Latour, French painter and lithographer (d. 1904)
1841 – Berthe Morisot, French painter (d. 1895)
1845 – Henry Petty-Fitzmaurice, 5th Marquess of Lansdowne, English politician, 34th Governor-General of India (d. 1927)
1850 – Pierre Loti, French captain and author (d. 1923)
1856 – J. F. Archibald, Australian journalist and publisher, co-founded The Bulletin (d. 1919)
1861 – Mehmed VI, Ottoman sultan (d. 1926)
1862 – Carrie Derick, Canadian botanist and geneticist (d. 1941)
1863 – Manuel de Oliveira Gomes da Costa, Portuguese general and politician, 10th President of Portugal (d. 1929)
  1863   – Richard F. Outcault, American author and illustrator (d. 1928)
1869 – Robert Fournier-Sarlovèze, French polo player and politician (d. 1937)
1870 – George Pearce, Australian carpenter and politician (d. 1952)
1875 – Albert Schweitzer, French-German physician and philosopher, Nobel Prize laureate (d. 1965)
1882 – Hendrik Willem van Loon, Dutch-American historian and journalist (d. 1944)
1883 – Nina Ricci, Italian-French fashion designer (d. 1970)
1886 – Hugh Lofting, English author and poet, created Doctor Dolittle (d. 1947)
1887 – Hugo Steinhaus, Polish mathematician and academic (d. 1972)
1892 – Martin Niemöller, German pastor and theologian (d. 1984)
  1892   – Hal Roach, American actor, director, and producer (d. 1992)
  1892   – George Wilson, English footballer (d. 1961)
1894 – Ecaterina Teodoroiu, Romanian soldier and nurse (d. 1917)
1896 – John Dos Passos, American novelist, poet, and playwright (d. 1970)
1897 – Hasso von Manteuffel, German general and politician (d. 1978)
1899 – Carlos P. Romulo, Filipino soldier and politician, President of the United Nations General Assembly (d. 1985)

1901–present
1901 – Bebe Daniels, American actress (d. 1971)
  1901   – Alfred Tarski, Polish-American mathematician and philosopher (d. 1983)
1904 – Cecil Beaton, English photographer, painter, and costume designer (d. 1980)
  1904   – Emily Hahn, American journalist and author (d. 1997)
  1904   – Babe Siebert, Canadian ice hockey player and coach (d. 1939)
1905 – Mildred Albert, American fashion commentator, TV and radio personality, and fashion show producer (d. 1991)
  1905   – Takeo Fukuda, Japanese politician, 67th Prime Minister of Japan (d. 1995)
1906 – William Bendix, American actor (d. 1964)
1907 – Georges-Émile Lapalme, Canadian lawyer and politician (d. 1985)
1908 – Russ Columbo, American singer, violinist, and actor (d. 1934)
1909 – Brenda Forbes, English-American actress (d. 1996)
  1909   – Joseph Losey, American director, producer, and screenwriter (d. 1984)
1911 – Anatoly Rybakov, Russian-American author (d. 1998)
1912 – Tillie Olsen, American short story writer (d. 2007)
1914 – Harold Russell, Canadian-American soldier and actor (d. 2002)
  1914   – Selahattin Ülkümen, Turkish diplomat (d. 2003)
1915 – Mark Goodson, American game show producer, created Family Feud and The Price Is Right (d. 1992) 
1919 – Giulio Andreotti, Italian journalist and politician, 41st Prime Minister of Italy (d. 2013)
  1919   – Andy Rooney, American soldier, journalist, critic, and television personality (d. 2011)
1920 – Bertus de Harder, Dutch footballer and manager (d. 1982)
1921 – Murray Bookchin, American author and philosopher (d. 2006)
  1921   – Kenneth Bulmer, American author (d. 2005)
1922 – Diana Wellesley, Duchess of Wellington (d. 2010)
1923 – Gerald Arpino, American dancer and choreographer (d. 2008)
  1923   – Fred Beckey, American mountaineer and author (d. 2017)
1924 – Carole Cook, American actress and singer (d. 2023)
  1924   – Guy Williams, American actor (d. 1989)
1925 – Jean-Claude Beton, Algerian-French engineer and businessman, founded Orangina (d. 2013)
  1925   – Moscelyne Larkin, American ballerina (d. 2012)
  1925   – Yukio Mishima, Japanese author, poet, and playwright (d. 1970)
1926 – Frank Aletter, American actor (d. 2009)
  1926   – Warren Mitchell, English actor and screenwriter (d. 2015)
  1926   – Tom Tryon, American actor and author (d. 1991)
1927 – Zuzana Růžičková, Czech harpsichord player (d. 2017)
1928 – Lars Forssell, Swedish author, poet, and songwriter (d. 2007)
  1928   – Hans Kornberg, German-English biologist and academic (d. 2019)
  1928   – Garry Winogrand, American photographer and author (d. 1984)
1929 – Peter Barkworth, English actor (d. 2006)
1930 – Johnny Grande, American pianist and accordion player (d. 2006)
  1930   – Kenny Wheeler, Canadian-English trumpet player and composer (d. 2014)
1931 – Frank Costigan, Australian lawyer and politician (d. 2009)
  1931   – Martin Holdgate, English biologist and academic
1932 – Don Garlits, American race car driver and engineer
1933 – Stan Brakhage, American director and producer (d. 2003)
1934 – Richard Briers, English actor (d. 2013)
  1934   – Pierre Darmon, French tennis player
  1934   – Alberto Rodriguez Larreta, Argentinian race car driver (d. 1977)
1936 – Clarence Carter, American blues and soul singer-songwriter, musician, and record producer
1937 – J. Bernlef, Dutch author and poet (d. 2012)
  1937   – Ken Higgs, English cricketer and coach (d. 2016)
  1937   – Leo Kadanoff, American physicist and academic (d. 2015)
  1937   – Rao Gopal Rao, Indian actor, producer, and politician (d. 1994)
  1937   – Sonny Siebert, American baseball player
  1937   – Billie Jo Spears, American country singer (d. 2011)
1938 – Morihiro Hosokawa, Japanese journalist and politician, 79th Prime Minister of Japan
  1938   – Jack Jones, American singer and actor
  1938   – Allen Toussaint, American singer-songwriter, pianist, and producer (d. 2015)
1939 – Kurt Moylan, Guamanian businessman and politician, 1st Lieutenant Governor of Guam
1940 – Julian Bond, American academic and politician (d. 2015)
  1940   – Ron Kostelnik, American football player (d. 1993)
  1940   – Siegmund Nimsgern, German opera singer
  1940   – Trevor Nunn, English director and composer
  1940   – Vasilka Stoeva, Bulgarian discus thrower
1941 – Nicholas Brooks, English historian (d. 2014)
  1941   – Faye Dunaway, American actress and producer
  1941   – Gibby Gilbert, American golfer
  1941   – Milan Kučan, Slovenian politician, 1st President of Slovenia
1942 – Dave Campbell, American baseball player and sportscaster
  1942   – Gerben Karstens, Dutch cyclist (d. 2022)
1943 – Angelo Bagnasco, Italian cardinal
  1943   – Mariss Jansons, Latvian conductor (d. 2019)
  1943   – Shannon Lucid, American biochemist and astronaut
  1943   – Holland Taylor, American actress and playwright
1944 – Marjoe Gortner, American actor and evangelist
  1944   – Graham Marsh, Australian golfer and architect
  1944   – Nina Totenberg, American journalist
1945 – Kathleen Chalfant, American actress
  1945   – Maina Gielgud, English ballerina and director
1947 – Taylor Branch, American historian and author 
  1947   – Bev Perdue, American educator and politician, 73rd Governor of North Carolina
  1947   – Bill Werbeniuk, Canadian snooker player (d. 2003)
1948 – T Bone Burnett, American singer-songwriter, guitarist, and producer 
  1948   – Muhriz of Negeri Sembilan, Yamtuan Besar of Negeri Sembilan
  1948   – Carl Weathers, American football player and actor
1949 – Lawrence Kasdan, American director, producer, and screenwriter
  1949   – Mary Robison, American short story writer and novelist
  1949   – İlyas Salman, Turkish actor, director, and screenwriter
  1949   – Lamar Williams, American bass player (d. 1983)
1950 – Rambhadracharya, Indian religious leader, scholar, and author
  1950   – Arthur Byron Cover, American author and screenwriter
1951 – O. Panneerselvam, Indian politician, 7th Chief Minister of Tamil Nadu
1952 – Sydney Biddle Barrows, American businesswoman and author
  1952   – Maureen Dowd, American journalist and author
  1952   – Konstantinos Iosifidis, Greek footballer and manager
  1952   – Călin Popescu-Tăriceanu, Romanian engineer and politician, 60th Prime Minister of Romania
1953 – David Clary, English chemist and academic
  1953   – Denzil Douglas, Caribbean educator and politician, 2nd Prime Minister of Saint Kitts and Nevis
  1953   – Hans Westerhoff, Dutch biologist and academic
1954 – Jim Duggan, American professional wrestler
1956 – Étienne Daho, Algerian-French singer-songwriter and producer
1957 – Anchee Min, Chinese-American painter, photographer, and author
1959 – Geoff Tate, German-American singer-songwriter and musician
1961 – Rob Hall, New Zealand mountaineer (d. 1996)
1963 – Steven Soderbergh, American director, producer, and screenwriter
1964 – Beverly Kinch, English long jumper and sprinter
  1964   – Shepard Smith, American television journalist
1965 – Mark Addy, English actor
  1965   – Marc Delissen, Dutch field hockey player, coach, and lawyer
  1965   – Bob Essensa, Canadian ice hockey player and coach
  1965   – Jemma Redgrave, British actress
1966 – Terry Angus, English footballer
  1966   – Marko Hietala, Finnish singer-songwriter, bass player, and producer
  1966   – Nadia Maftouni, Iranian philosopher
  1966   – Dan Schneider, American TV producer
1967 – Leonardo Ortolani, Italian author and illustrator, created Rat-Man
  1967   – Emily Watson, English actress
  1967   – Zakk Wylde, American guitarist and singer
1968 – LL Cool J, American rapper and actor
  1968   – Ruel Fox, English-Montserratian footballer, manager and chairman
1969 – Jason Bateman, American actor, director, and producer
  1969   – Martin Bicknell, English cricketer
  1969   – Dave Grohl, American singer-songwriter, guitarist, and drummer
1971 – Lasse Kjus, Norwegian skier
  1971   – Bert Konterman, Dutch footballer and manager
  1971   – Antonios Nikopolidis, Greek footballer and manager
1972 – Kyle Brady, American football player and sportscaster
  1972   – Dion Forster, South African minister, theologian, and author
  1972   – James Key, English engineer
1973 – Giancarlo Fisichella, Italian race car driver
  1973   – Paul Tisdale, English footballer and manager
1974 – Kevin Durand, Canadian actor
  1974   – David Flitcroft, English footballer and manager
1975 – Georgina Cates, English actress
1976 – Vincenzo Chianese, Italian footballer
1977 – Narain Karthikeyan, Indian race car driver 
  1977   – Terry Ryan, Canadian ice hockey player
1978 – Shawn Crawford, American sprinter
1979 – Karen Elson, English singer-songwriter, guitarist, and model
  1979   – Evans Soligo, Italian footballer
1980 – Clive Clarke, Irish footballer
  1980   – Cory Gibbs, American soccer player
1981 – Abdelmalek Cherrad, Algerian footballer
  1981   – Hyleas Fountain, American heptathlete
  1981   – Concepción Montaner, Spanish long jumper
  1981   – Jadranka Đokić, Croatian actress
1982 – Marc Broussard, American singer-songwriter and guitarist
  1982   – Zach Gilford, American actor
  1982   – Léo Lima, Brazilian footballer
  1982   – Thomas Longosiwa, Kenyan runner
  1982   – Víctor Valdés, Spanish footballer
1983 – Cesare Bovo, Italian footballer
  1983   – Jason Krejza, Australian cricketer
1984 – Erick Aybar, American baseball player
  1984   – Erika Matsuo, Japanese violinist
  1984   – Mike Pelfrey, American baseball player
1985 – Jake Choi, American actor
  1985   – Joel Rosario, Dominican-American jockey
  1985   – Shawn Sawyer, Canadian figure skater
1986 – Yohan Cabaye, French footballer
  1986   – Alessio Cossu, Italian footballer
  1986   – Matt Riddle, American professional wrestler and mixed martial artist
1987 – Atsushi Hashimoto, Japanese actor
  1987   – Jess Fishlock, Welsh footballer
1988 – Kacey Barnfield, English actress
  1988   – Jack P. Shepherd, English actor
1989 – Frankie Bridge, English singer-songwriter and dancer 
1990 – Kacy Catanzaro, American athlete and professional wrestler
  1990   – Lelisa Desisa, Ethiopian runner
  1990   – Grant Gustin, American actor and singer
  1990   – Áron Szilágyi, Hungarian fencer
1992 – Robbie Brady, Irish footballer
  1992   – Chieh-Yu Hsu, American tennis player
  1992   – Qiang Wang, Chinese tennis player
1993 – Daniel Bessa, Brazilian footballer
1994 – Kai, South Korean singer, model, actor and dancer
1995 – Georgios Diamantakos, Greek basketball player
  1995   – Alex Johnston, Australian rugby league player
1997 – Francesco Bagnaia, Italian motorcycle racer
1998 – Maddison Inglis, Australian tennis player
1999 – Declan Rice, English footballer

Deaths

Pre-1600
 769 – Cui Huan, chancellor of the Tang Dynasty 
 927 – Wang Yanhan, king of Min (Ten Kingdoms)
 937 – Zhang Yanlang, Chinese official
 973 – Ekkehard I, Frankish monk and poet
1092 – Vratislaus II of Bohemia
1163 – Ladislaus II of Hungary (b. 1131)
1236 – Saint Sava, Serbian archbishop and saint (b. 1175)
1301 – Andrew III of Hungary (b. 1265)
1331 – Odoric of Pordenone, Italian priest and explorer (b. 1286)
1465 – Thomas Beckington, English statesman and prelate
1476 – John de Mowbray, 4th Duke of Norfolk (b. 1444)
1555 – Jacques Dubois, French anatomist (b. 1478)

1601–1900
1640 – Thomas Coventry, 1st Baron Coventry, English lawyer, judge, and politician, Attorney General for England and Wales (b. 1578)
1648 – Caspar Barlaeus, Dutch historian, poet, and theologian (b. 1584)
1676 – Francesco Cavalli, Italian organist and composer (b. 1602)
1679 – Jacques de Billy, French mathematician and academic (b. 1602)
1701 – Tokugawa Mitsukuni, Japanese daimyō (b. 1628)
1753 – George Berkeley, Anglo-Irish philosopher and author (b. 1685)
1766 – Frederick V of Denmark (b. 1723)
1776 – Edward Cornwallis, English general and politician, Governor of Gibraltar (b. 1713)
1786 – Michael Arne, English organist and composer (b. 1741)
  1786   – Meshech Weare, American lawyer and politician, 1st Governor of New Hampshire (b. 1713)
1823 – Athanasios Kanakaris, Greek politician (b. 1760)
1825 – George Dance the Younger, English architect and surveyor (b. 1741)
1833 – Seraphim of Sarov, Russian monk and saint (b. 1759)
1867 – Jean-Auguste-Dominique Ingres, French painter and illustrator (b. 1780) 
1874 – Johann Philipp Reis, German physicist and academic, invented the Reis telephone (b. 1834)
1883 – Napoléon Coste, French guitarist and composer (b. 1806)
1888 – Stephen Heller, Hungarian pianist and composer (b. 1813)
1889 – Ema Pukšec, Croatian soprano (b. 1834)
1892 – Prince Albert Victor, Duke of Clarence and Avondale (b. 1864)
  1892   – Alexander J. Davis, American architect (b. 1803)
1898 – Lewis Carroll, English novelist, poet, and mathematician (b. 1832)

1901–present
1901 – Mandell Creighton, English bishop and historian (b. 1843)
  1901   – Charles Hermite, French mathematician and theorist (b. 1822)
1905 – Ernst Abbe, German physicist and engineer (b. 1840)
1907 – Sir James Fergusson, 6th Baronet, Scottish soldier and politician, 6th Governor of New Zealand (b. 1832)
1908 – Holger Drachmann, Danish poet and playwright (b. 1846)
1915 – Richard Meux Benson, English priest and saint, founded the Society of St. John the Evangelist (b. 1824)
1919 – Platon, Estonian bishop and saint (b. 1869)
1920 – John Francis Dodge, American businessman, co-founded the Dodge Automobile Company (b. 1864)
1926 – August Sedláček, Czech historian and author (b. 1843)
1934 – Ioan Cantacuzino, Romanian physician and bacteriologist (b. 1863)
1937 – Jaishankar Prasad, Indian poet, author, and playwright (b. 1889)
1942 – Porfirio Barba-Jacob, Colombian poet and author (b. 1883)
1943 – Laura E. Richards, American author and poet (b. 1850)
1944 – Mehmet Emin Yurdakul, Turkish author and politician (b. 1869)
1949 – Harry Stack Sullivan, American psychiatrist and psychoanalyst (b. 1892)
1951 – Gregorios Xenopoulos, Greek author, journalist, and playwright (b. 1867)
1952 – Artur Kapp, Estonian composer and conductor (b. 1878)
1957 – Humphrey Bogart, American actor (b. 1899)
1959 – Eivind Berggrav, Norwegian bishop and translator (b. 1884)
1961 – Barry Fitzgerald, Irish actor (b. 1888)
1962 – M. Visvesvaraya, Indian engineer, scholar, and politician (b. 1860)
1965 – Jeanette MacDonald, American actress and singer (b. 1903)
1966 – Sergei Korolev, Ukrainian-Russian engineer and academic (b. 1906)
1968 – Dorothea Mackellar, Australian poet and author (b. 1885)
1970 – William Feller, Croatian-American mathematician and academic (b. 1906)
  1970   – Asım Gündüz, Turkish general (b. 1880)
1972 – Horst Assmy, German footballer (b. 1933)
  1972   – Frederick IX of Denmark (b. 1899)
1976 – Abdul Razak Hussein, Malaysian lawyer and politician, 2nd Prime Minister of Malaysia (b. 1922)
1977 – Anthony Eden, English soldier and politician, Prime Minister of the United Kingdom (b. 1897)
  1977   – Peter Finch, English-Australian actor (b. 1916)
  1977   – Anaïs Nin, French-American essayist and memoirist (b. 1903)
1978 – Harold Abrahams, English sprinter, lawyer, and journalist (b. 1899)
  1978   – Kurt Gödel, Austrian-American mathematician and philosopher (b. 1906)
  1978   – Robert Heger, German conductor and composer (b. 1886)
  1978   – Blossom Rock, American actress (b. 1895)
1980 – Robert Ardrey, American-South African author, playwright, and screenwriter (b. 1908)
  1981   – G. Lloyd Spencer, American lieutenant and politician (b. 1893)
1984 – Ray Kroc, American businessman and philanthropist (b. 1902)
1986 – Donna Reed, American actress (b. 1921)
1987 – Turgut Demirağ, Turkish director, producer, and screenwriter (b. 1921)
  1987   – Douglas Sirk, German-Swiss director and screenwriter (b. 1900)
1988 – Georgy Malenkov, Russian engineer and politician, 5th Premier of the Soviet Union (b. 1902)
1991 – Gordon Bryant, Australian educator and politician (b. 1914)
1995 – Alexander Gibson, Scottish conductor (b. 1926)
1996 – Onno Tunç, Armenian-Turkish composer (b. 1948)
1997 – Dollard Ménard, Canadian general (b. 1913)
2000 – Leonard Weisgard, American author and illustrator (b. 1916)
2004 – Uta Hagen, German-American actress (b. 1919)
  2004   – Ron O'Neal, American actor, director, and screenwriter (b. 1937)
2005 – Charlotte MacLeod, Canadian-American author (b. 1922)
  2005   – Conroy Maddox, English painter and educator (b. 1912)
  2005   – Rudolph Moshammer, German fashion designer (b. 1940)
  2005   – Jesús Rafael Soto, Venezuelan sculptor and painter (b. 1923)
2006 – Henri Colpi, French director and screenwriter (b. 1921)
  2006   – Jim Gary, American sculptor (b. 1939)
  2006   – Shelley Winters, American actress (b. 1920)
2007 – Vassilis Photopoulos, Greek painter, director, and set designer (b. 1934)
2008 – Judah Folkman, American physician, biologist, and academic (b. 1933)
2009 – Jan Kaplický, Czech architect, designed the Selfridges Building (b. 1937)
  2009   – Ricardo Montalbán, Mexican actor (b. 1920)
2010 – Antonio Fontán, Spanish journalist and academic (b. 1923)
2011 – Georgia Carroll, American singer, model and actress (b. 1919)
2012 – Txillardegi, Spanish linguist and politician (b. 1929)
  2012   – Dan Evins, American businessman, founded Cracker Barrel Old Country Store (b. 1935)
  2012   – Arfa Karim, Pakistani student and computer prodigy, youngest Microsoft Certified Professional in 2004 (b. 1995)
  2012   – Giampiero Moretti, Italian entrepreneur and race car driver (b. 1940)
  2012   – Rosy Varte, Armenian-French actress (b. 1923)
2013 – Conrad Bain, Canadian-American actor (b. 1923)
2014 – Jon Bing, Norwegian author, scholar, and academic (b. 1944)
  2014   – Juan Gelman, Argentinian poet and author (b. 1930)
  2014   – Flavio Testi, Italian composer and musicologist (b. 1923)
2015 – Bob Boyd, American basketball player and coach (b. 1930)
  2015   – Zhang Wannian, Chinese general (b. 1928)
2016 – René Angélil, Canadian music producer, talent manager, and singer (b. 1942)
  2016   – Alan Rickman, English actor (b. 1946)
2017 – Zhou Youguang, Chinese sociologist, (b. 1906)
2018 – Spanky Manikan, Filipino veteran actor (b. 1942) 
  2018   – Cyrille Regis, French Guianan-English footballer (b. 1958) 
2021 – Joel Robert, Belgian professional motocross racer (b. 1943)
2023 – Mukarram Jah, 8th Nizam of Hyderabad (b. 1933)

Holidays and observances
 Christian feast day:
 Barba'shmin
 Devasahayam Pillai (Catholic Church)
 Divina Pastora (Barquisimeto)
 Eivind Berggrav (Lutheran)
 Felix of Nola
 Macrina the Elder
 Odoric of Pordenone
 January 14 (Eastern Orthodox liturgics)
 Defender of the Motherland Day (Uzbekistan) 
 Feast of the Ass (Medieval Christianity)
 Flag Day (Georgia) 
 National Forest Conservation Day (Thailand) 
 Old New Year, and its related observance:
Azhyrnykhua (Abkhazia)
Yennayer (Berbers)
 Ratification Day (United States)
 Revolution and Youth Day (Tunisia) 
 Sidereal winter solstice celebrations in South and Southeast Asian cultures; marking the transition of the Sun to Capricorn, and the first day of the six months Uttarayana period. (see April 14):
Magh Bihu (Assam)
 Maghe Sankranti (Nepal)
 Maghi (Punjab, Haryana, Himachal Pradesh)
 Makar Sankranti (India)
 The first day of Pongal (Tamil Nadu)
 Uttarayan (Uttarakhand, Gujarat and Rajasthan)
 World Logic Day (UNESCO)

Notes
In the 20th and 21st centuries the Julian calendar is 13 days behind the Gregorian calendar, thus January 14 is sometimes celebrated as New Year's Day (Old New Year) by religious groups who use the Julian calendar.

References

External links

 BBC: On This Day
 
 Historical Events on January 14

Days of the year
January